Sebring (23 September 2005 – 23 February 2019) was a top class two-year-old Australian Thoroughbred racehorse, that won five of his six race starts. After winning the AJC Breeders' Plate in his spring debut, he had wins in the Golden Slipper and AJC Sires Produce Stakes and second place, defeated by a nose, in the AJC Champagne Stakes.

Breeding
He was a chestnut stallion standing 16.1 hands high that was foaled on 23 September 2005. Sebring was by More Than Ready from Purespeed by Flying Spur. Bred by Corumbene Stud Pty Ltd, he was sold at the 2007 Conrad Jupiters Magic Millions Sale to Star Thoroughbreds for A$130,000.

Race record
He enjoyed great success as a two-year-old, including Group One (G1) wins in the Golden Slipper and AJC Sires Produce Stakes.

In Sydney, Blake Shinn, a former Victorian jockey, forfeited the $3,525,800 Golden Slipper ride to Glen Boss because of a suspension. He returned to the $450,000 AJC Sires Produce Stakes at Randwick in which he rode Sebring to win the race, the second leg of the juvenile triple crown.

On 3 May 2008, Sebring failed to complete the triple crown when he was defeated by a short head in the Champagne Stakes by Samantha Miss.

In late July 2008, Sebring had stress-related bone bruising and had to be spelled for two months, effectively ending any attempt at the Melbourne Spring Racing Carnival.

Stud record
Following an unsatisfactory fitness trial on 27 January 2009, the owners of Sebring decided to retire the horse to stud. He was standing at the Widden Stud at a service fee of $60,500 inc GST.

Notable stock

Sebring has currently sired 8 individual Group 1 winners:

c = colt, f = filly, g = gelding

Pedigree

Death
Sebring died of a heart attack aged 13 years whilst still performing stud duties at Widden Stud.

See also
List of leading Thoroughbred racehorses

References

  News Report Autumn 2008
  Catalogue Page from 2007 Magic Millions Catalogue
  News Report Winter 2008

2005 racehorse births
2019 racehorse deaths
Racehorses bred in Australia
Racehorses trained in Australia
Thoroughbred family 6-c